HMS Circe (J214) was a turbine engine-powered  during the Second World War.

Design and description

The ships' complement consisted of 85 officers and ratings.

The reciprocating ships had two vertical triple-expansion steam engines, each driving one shaft, using steam provided by two Admiralty three-drum boilers.

The Algerine class was armed with a QF  Mk V anti-aircraft gun and four twin-gun mounts for Oerlikon 20 mm cannon. The latter guns were in short supply when the first ships were being completed and they often got a proportion of single mounts. By 1944, single-barrel Bofors 40 mm mounts began replacing the twin 20 mm mounts on a one for one basis. All of the ships were fitted for four throwers and two rails for depth charges.

Construction and career
The ship was ordered on 15 November 1940 at the Harland & Wolff at Belfast, Ireland. She was laid down on 21 July 1941 and launched on 22 May 1944. The ship was commissioned on 16 October 1942.

In April 1943, she was selected for duty with her Minesweeping Flotilla for clearance of passage through Galita and Sicilian channels to Tripoli to ensure safe passage for allied ships, also known as Operation Antidote. In July, the ship together with Acute and Albacore took part in minesweeping missions prior to Operation Husky. In September, she was deployed to sweep the area in preparation for Operation Avalanche.

On 21 January 1944, she was deployed with Acute, Espiegle and Spanker to conduct minesweeping mission North West of Anzio in preparation for Operation Shingle.

From January to February 1945, she swept the waters in the Kinaros and Doro Channels.

In April 1946, the ship and her sisters were sent back to the UK to be decommissioned on arrival. The ship was put into the reserve fleet and laid up at Harwich until the ship was transferred to be used as a RNVR Drill Ship at Dundee.

In 1956, she was put on the disposal list and sold to BISCO for scrap by the Arnott Young & Co. at Glasgow, Scotland in which she arrived in March 1957.

References

Bibliography
 
 
 Peter Elliott (1977) Allied Escort Ships of World War II. MacDonald & Janes, 
 

 

Algerine-class minesweepers of the Royal Navy
Ships built in Belfast
1942 ships
World War II minesweepers of the United Kingdom